Arriving is a studio album released in 2004 by Chris Tomlin. The album has received RIAA "Platinum" status and peaked at No. 3 on Billboards Top Christian Albums chart. As of October 2008, "How Great Is Our God" is No. 1 and "Holy Is the Lord" is No. 7 on CCLI's Top 100 songs used in churches in the U.S.

"Indescribable" is a cover of Laura Story, originally performed by Laura Story herself in 2003. Tomlin covered the song on this album.

Likewise, "Your Grace Is Enough" is a cover of a Matt Maher song, though Tomlin rewrote the chorus compared to Maher's original version.

Name 

Tomlin named this album after a passage he read in Isaiah 40 because he said he feels "as though we're like this landing strip in the desert for our great, incredible God to arrive on; a way for Him to come into people's lives."

Track listing

Personnel 
 Chris Tomlin – lead vocals, acoustic piano (11)
 Ed Cash – backing vocals (1–6, 8, 10, 11), acoustic guitars (1–6, 8–11), electric guitars (1), programming (1–6, 8, 9, 11), mandolin (2), keyboards (2, 3, 5, 9), acoustic piano (3), classical guitar (7), bass (7)
 Laura Story – acoustic piano (1)
 Daniel Carson – electric guitars (1–6, 8–11)
 Jesse Reeves – bass (1–6, 8–11)
 Dan Needham – drums (1, 3, 5, 9, 10, 11)
 Joey Parish – drums (2, 4, 6, 8, 9, 10)
 Matt Slocum – cello (7)
 Christy Nockels – backing vocals (3)
 Nathan Nockels – backing vocals (3)
 Darwin Hobbs – backing vocals (3, 9)
 Gale Mayes-West – backing vocals (3, 9)
 Leanne Palmore – backing vocals (3, 9)
 Angela Primm – backing vocals (3, 9)
 Jerard Woods – backing vocals (3, 9), lead vocal (second verse of 9)
 Jovaun Woods – backing vocals (3, 9)
 Matt Wertz – backing vocals (3, 7)
 Steven Curtis Chapman – backing vocals (5)
 Melissa Polinar – backing vocals and ad-lib on ending (9)

Production
 Ed Cash – producer, recording engineer, mixing
 Louie Giglio – executive producer
 Brad O'Donnell – executive producer
 Ed's, Franklin, Tennessee – recording location, mixing location
 Scott Olivier – additional recording engineer
 Stardog, Austin, Texas – additional recording location
 Steve Bishir – mixing 
 Richard Dodd – mastering
 Thomas Petillo – photography
 Jan Cook – creative direction
 Benji Peck – art direction, design

Singles 

 "Indescribable" (2004)
 "Holy Is the Lord" (2005)
 "How Great Is Our God" (2005)

Awards 

On 2005, the album won a Dove Award for Praise & Worship Album of the Year at the 36th GMA Dove Awards.

References 

2004 albums
Chris Tomlin albums